This article lists the main modern pentathlon events and their results for 1999.

International modern pentathlon events
 Note: The results in the UIPM website for this event (Winnipeg) is completely wrong.
 August 3: 1999 Pan American Games in  Winnipeg
 Individual winners:  Velizar Iliev (m) /  Mary Beth Iagorashvili (f)
 August 25: 1999 CISM Modern Pentathlon Championships in  Warsaw
 Men's Individual winner:  Libor Capalini
 Men's Team Relay winners:  (Roman Wagner, Eric Walther, & Jan Veder)

World modern pentathlon events
 Note: The results for the women's individual event (Budapest) was incomplete.
 Note: The results for the women's individual event (Chieti) was incomplete.
 Note: The results for the men's team relay event (Chieti) was inconclusive.
 Note: There was no results for the men's event (Bayreuth) here.
 July 13: 1999 World Modern Pentathlon Championships in  Budapest
 Men's Individual winner:  Gábor Balogh
 Men's Team Relay winners:  (Peter Sarfalvi, Gábor Balogh, & Akos Hanzely)
 Women's Team Relay winners:  (Steph Cook & Georgina Harland)
 August 4: 1999 World Junior Modern Pentathlon Championships in  Chieti
 Men's Individual winner:  CHOI Jae-kun 
 Women's Team Relay winners:  (Katarzyna Baran, Dominica Grodzicka, & Marlene Zolnowska)
 September 3: 1999 World Youth "A" Modern Pentathlon Championships in  Bayreuth
 Women's Individual winner:  Tatiana Gorliak

Continental modern pentathlon events
 Note: The results for the men's team relay event (Székesfehérvár) was inconclusive.
 Note: It was not clear which city hosted the EMPC here.
 Note: It was not clear who won the women's individual event (Santiago) here.
 Note: There was no results for the women's individual (Sant Boi de Llobregat) event.
 Note: The results for the men's team relay event (Bishkek) was inconclusive.
 April 12: 1999 European Junior Modern Pentathlon Championships in  Székesfehérvár
 Junior Individual winners:  Eric Walther (m) /  Zsuzsanna Vörös (f)
 Women's Junior Team Relay winners:  (Noemi Feher, Nora Simoka, & Vivien Mathe)
 May 27: 1999 European Modern Pentathlon Championships (#1) in  Drzonków
 Individual winners:  Gábor Balogh (m) /  Katalin Partics (f)
 June 3: 1999 European Modern Pentathlon Championships (#2) in  Tampere
 Men's Individual winner:  Nicolae Papuc
 June 27: 1999 South American Modern Pentathlon Championships in  Santiago
 Men's Individual winner:  Jan Veder
 Women's Individual winner:  Caroline Delemer or  Steph Cook
 July 23: 1999 European Youth "B" Modern Pentathlon Championships in  Sant Boi de Llobregat
 Youth Individual winner:  Andrejus Zadneprovskis
 October 4: 1999 Asian Modern Pentathlon Championships in  Bishkek
 Men's Individual winner:  Andrejus Zadneprovskis

1999 Modern Pentathlon World Cup
 Note: The women's results for the Mexico City event (#2) was inconclusive.
 Note: The women's results for the Rome event (#3) was inconclusive.
 March 6: MPWC #1 in  San Antonio
 Men's Individual winners:  Janne Pykalisto &  Akos Hanzely
 Women's Individual winners:  Anna Sulima &  Nora Simoka
 Women's Team Relay winners:  (Nora Simoka, Eva Sasvari, & Vivien Mathe)
 March 7: MPWC #2 in  Mexico City
 Men's Individual winners:  Marco Lutzenberger &  Vakhtang Iagorashvili
 Men's Team Relay winners:  (Mikhail Kuznetov, Ilia Frolov, & Alexei Velikodnyi)
 April 8: MPWC #3 in  Rome
 Men's Individual winner:  Michal Sedlecky
 April 22: MPWC #4 in  Darmstadt
 Women's Individual winners:  Jeanette Malm &  Steph Cook
 Women's Team Relay winners:  (Csilla Füri, Nora Simoka, & Zsuzsanna Vörös)
 May 6 & 7: MPWC #5 in  Budapest &  Aix-en-Provence
 Men's Individual winner:  Tzanko Hantov
 Women's Individual winners:  Steph Cook &  Federica Foghetti
 September 25 & 26: MPWC #6 (final) in  Sydney
 Individual winners:  Sébastien Deleigne (m) /  Zsuzsanna Vörös (f)
 Men's Team Relay winners:  (Peter Sarfalvi, Gábor Balogh, & Akos Hanzely)
 Women's Team Relay winners:  (Georgina Harland, Steph Cook, & Kate Allenby)

References

External links
 Union Internationale de Pentathlon Moderne Website (UIPM)

 
Modern pentathlon
1999 in sports